Río San Juan (Spanish for St. John's River) may refer to:

Rivers
 San Juan River (Argentina)
 Río Grande de San Juan in Bolivia and Argentina
 San Juan River (Vancouver Island) in Canada
 San Juan River (Colombia)
 Río San Juan, Dominican Republic
 San Juan River (Guatemala)
 San Juan River (Nicaragua)
 
 San Juan River (Metro Manila) and San Juan River (Calamba), both in the Philippines
 St. Johns River in Florida and San Juan River in Utah, both in the United States
 San Juan River (Uruguay)

Other
 Río San Juan Municipality, Dominican Republic
 Río San Juan Department and Río San Juan Wildlife Refuge in Nicaragua

See also
 San Juan River (disambiguation)